The Johnson-White House near Sontag, Mississippi was built c. 1820 by settler Andrew Johnson, Sr.  It is the oldest dog trot style house in the county.

By 1980 the breezeway had been closed off to make an additional room in the house, and a gable had been added overhead.  The property also included two log buildings:  a smokehouse with half-notched corners and another outbuilding with saddle-notched corners.

It was listed on the National Register in 1980.

References

Houses on the National Register of Historic Places in Mississippi
Houses completed in 1820
Houses in Lawrence County, Mississippi
Dogtrot architecture
National Register of Historic Places in Lawrence County, Mississippi